Paola Antonelli (born 1963 in Sassari, Sardinia, Italy) is an Italian author, editor, architect, and curator. She is currently the Senior Curator of the Department of Architecture & Design as well as the Director of R&D at the Museum of Modern Art (MoMA), New York City.

Antonelli was recognized with an AIGA Medal in 2015 for "expanding the influence of design in everyday life by sharing fresh and incisive observations and curating provocative exhibitions at MoMA". She was rated one of the one hundred most powerful people in the world of art by Art Review and Surface Magazine.

Although a recipient of a laurea degree in architecture from the Politecnico di Milano university in 1990, she has never worked as an architect. Antonelli has curated several architecture and design exhibitions in Italy, France, and Japan. She has been a contributing editor for Domus magazine (1987–91) and the design editor of Abitare magazine (1992–94). She has also contributed articles to several publications, among them Metropolis, the Harvard Design Review, I.D. magazine, Paper, Metropolitan Home, Harper's Bazaar, and Nest. In 2014 she was awarded an honorary doctorate by the Royal College of Art.

Career

Lecturer 
From 1991 to 1993, Antonelli was a lecturer at the University of California, Los Angeles, where she taught design history and theory. In the spring of 2003, she started to teach a course of design theory at the Harvard University Graduate School of Design. She has also lectured elsewhere on design and architecture in Europe and the United States and served on several international architecture and design juries.

Curator at The Museum of Modern Art, New York 
Antonelli joined MoMA in February 1994 and is a curator in the Department of Architecture and Design there. Her first high-profile exhibition for MoMA, "Mutant Materials in Contemporary Design" (1995), was followed by "Thresholds: Contemporary Design from the Netherlands" (1996), "Achille Castiglioni: Design!" (1997–98), "Projects 66: Campana/Ingo Maurer" (1999), "Open Ends," and "Matter" (September 2000-February 2001). Her exhibition "Workspheres" (2/8-4/22/2001) was devoted to the design of the workplace of the near future. In 2005 she curated the exhibition entitled "Safe: Design Takes on Risk" for MoMA.

She curated the exhibition entitled "Safe" in 2005 based on her show at the International Design Conference in Aspen (August 20–23, 2003), similarly entitled "Safe: Design Takes on Risk." Other recent projects include a book about food from the world over, as examples of distinctive design, and a television program on design. As a curator, Antonelli has added various video games to the permanent collection of the Museum of Modern Art and she has been attempting to include Boeing 747 in MoMA's permanent collection as well.

Together with Jamer Hunt, Antonelli established an installation entitled Design and Violence which focuses on the physical representation of some of humanity's most prominent features, such as sex, aggression, and smelliness.  One piece, for example, is a vial of synthetic sweat.  Of the exhibit, Antonelli says, "We wanted objects that have an ambiguous relationship with violence."  Each object—an outline of a drone, a self-guided bullet, a stiletto—is selected to highlight both the beneficial and also the destructive side of design.  Design is so multidimensional nowadays, and Antonelli and Hunt aimed to represent this.

In 2017, Antonelli and Michelle Millar Fisher curated "Items: Is Fashion Modern?", an exhibition that explores 111 items of clothing and accessories that have had a strong impact on the world in the 20th and 21st centuries and taught a related massive open online course (MOOC) titled Fashion as Design.

Design Philosophy 
Paola Antonelli's objective is to change the perception of design, making sure that people are aware of the importance of design in every day life.  She believes that design is an incredible expression of human creativity and that designers should feel responsibility towards the users they create for.  Without design, innovation would be futile, because no one would be able to use any new inventions. She is frustrated by the misconception that design is just styling and feels that it is her job to help people realize that it is so much more.

Controversy 
In an exhibit that featured video games such as Pac-Man, Tetris, and Minecraft, viewers are intended to actually play the games in order to showcase the interaction design of these products. The Guardian, for example, responded, "Sorry MoMA, Video Games Are Not Art".

Awards and honours 
Antonelli has been granted Honorary Doctorate degrees from the Royal College of Art and Kingston University in London, the ArtCenter College of Design in Pasadena, and Pratt Institute in New York. She has also received the following distinctions:
 2006 National Design Award, Cooper Hewitt (Smithsonian Institution)
 2007 TIME magazine design visionaries
 2010 , Raymond Loewy Foundation
 2011 Hall of Fame inductee, Art Directors Club (ADC) 
 2015 Medal, American Institute of Graphic Artists (AIGA) 
 2019 American Academy in Rome honouree 
 2020 London Design Medal
 2021 German Design Award Personality of the Year

Publications

Contributions
 Mutant Materials in Contemporary Design (1995)
 Achille Castiglioni: Design! (1997)
 From Pyramids to Spacecraft
 Talk to Me: Design and the Communication between People and Objects
 "Achille Castiglioni"
 "Satyendra Pakhalé Cultural nomad: From Project to Products"
 "Japanese Design"
 "Modern Contemporary"
 "Design the Elastic Mind"
 "Modern Contemporary; Art at MoMA Since 1980"
 Hella Jongerius – Misfit (2011)
 Pasta by Design – Forward Workspheres: Design and Contemporary Work Styles Margaret Helfand Architects – Introduction On the Table – On the American Table Safe: Design Takes on Risk – Grace Under Pressure Droog Design – Spirit of the Nineties No Discipline – Preface Items: Is Fashion Modern? "Satyendra Pakhalé Culture of Creation"
 Design Emergency (with Alice Rawsthorn)

See also
 TED Talks: Paola Antonelli treats design as art at TED in 2007
 Tom Bieling interviews Paola Antonelli: Thinking and Problem Making for [Design Research Network] in 2009
 "Designers on Top" presentation at Eyeo Festival 2012
 "Charlie Rose Show"
 "The Colbert Report Interview" (episode #1160, production code 09068, which originally aired on February 27, 2013)
 How to See: Items: Is Fashion Modern? at The Museum of Modern Art, New York
 Paola Antonelli and Abbi Jacobson discuss emoji, video games, the @ symbol, A Piece of Work Podcast, WNYC Studios and MoMA
 Paola Antonelli on curating (interview by Grant Gibson)

References

30. Antonelli, Paola. Workspheres: Design and Contemporary Work Styles. Museum of Modern Art, 2001.
31. Antonelli, Paola, and Steven Guarnaccia. Achille Castiglioni. Corraini Editore, 2006.

External links
 Items: Is Fashion Modern? at The Museum of Modern Art
 Fashion is Design on Coursera
 MoMA R&D
 "an Ambassador for Design", profile on BAIA Link network, Business Association''
 Paola Antonelli- The Future Italy America
 
 Treat design as art (TED2007)
 Why I brought Pac-Man to MoMA (TEDSalon NY2013)

1963 births
Architects from Sardinia
Living people
People from Sassari
Sardinian women
Polytechnic University of Milan alumni
Harvard Graduate School of Design faculty
People associated with the Museum of Modern Art (New York City)
Italian art curators
Italian women curators
Italian women historians
Italian art historians
Women art historians
Articles containing video clips
AIGA medalists
National Design Award winners
Italian women architects